The Prix Suzanne Bianchetti is an award in French cinema given annually since 1937 to the most promising young film actress.

The award was created by writer and actor René Jeanne (1887–1969) who served as the director of L'Etablissement Cinématographique des Armées. When his wife, the actress Suzanne Bianchetti, died in 1936 at the age of 47, he established an award dedicated to her memory to be given annually to the most promising young actress.

The award was given for the first time in 1937 to actress Junie Astor for her performance in the film Women's Club. The award comes in the form of a medallion engraved with Suzanne Bianchetti's image. Since its inception, the Prix Suzanne Bianchetti has been awarded to many of the greatest names in French cinema who went on to national and international stardom.

List of winners (incomplete)
1937 – Junie Astor (Women's Club, 1936)
1938 – Janine Darcey
1939 – Sylvia Bataille
1940 – Micheline Presle (Girls in Distress, 1939)
1941–1945 no award due to World War II
1947 – Simone Signoret (Macadam, 1946)
1948 – Odile Versois
1949 – Arlette Thomas
1950 – Christiane Lenier
1951 – Nadine Alari
1952 – Nadine Basile
1953 – Etchika Choureau (L'Envers du paradis, 1953)
1954 – Marina Vlady
1955 – Geneviève Kervine
1956 – Annie Girardot (L'Homme aux clefs d'or, 1956)
1957 – Anne Doat
1958 – Pascale Petit (One Life, 1957)
1959 – Roger Dumas (awarded to a male actor)
1960 – Perrette Pradier
1961 – Renée Marie Potet
1962 – Corinne Marchand
1963 – Marie Dubois
1964 – Colette Castel
1965 – Macha Méril
1966 – Geneviève Bujold (Le voleur)
1967 – Caroline Cellier (awarded for a stage performance in Pygmalion)
1968 – Danièle Evenou
1970 – Ludmila Mikaël
1972 – Bulle Ogier
1974 – Isabelle Adjani (La Gifle, 1974)
1976 – Isabelle Huppert (The Judge and the Assassin, 1976)
1980 – Dominique Laffin
1986 – Juliette Binoche (Mauvais Sang, 1986)
1988 – Marianne Basler
1990 – Dominique Blanc 
1991 – Anouk Grinberg
1993 – Charlotte Kady
1994 – Isabelle Carré
1995 – Clotilde Courau
1996 – Sandrine Kiberlain
1998 – Virginie Ledoyen
2000 – Audrey Tautou  
2001 – Barbara Schulz
2002 – Françoise Gillard
2003 – Mélanie Doutey
2004 – Sara Forestier and Sophie Quinton
2005 – Chloé Lambert
2006 – Nathalie Boutefeu
2007 – Déborah François
2008 – Clotilde Hesme
2009 – Àstrid Bergès-Frisbey
2010 – Elodie Navarre
2011 – Anaïs Demoustier
2012 – Marie Kremer
2013 – Pauline Étienne
2014 – Adèle Haenel
2015 – Marine Vacth
2016 – Camille Cottin
2017 – Suliane Brahim
2018 – Camélia Jordana
2019 – Rebecca Marder
2020 – Mame Sane
2021 – Celeste Brunnquell

References

Adapted from the article Prix Suzanne Bianchetti, from Wikinfo, licensed under the GNU Free Documentation License.

French film awards
Awards established in 1937
1937 establishments in France